The spiny turbots are a family, Psettodidae, of relatively large, primitive flatfish found in the tropical waters of the east Atlantic and Indo-Pacific. The family contains just three species, all in the same genus, Psettodes. The common name comes from the presence of spines in the dorsal and anal fins, which may indicate an evolutionary relationship with the Perciformes. They are less asymmetrical than other flatfish, although the region around the eyes is twisted.

Species 
The currently recognized species in this genus are:
 Psettodes belcheri E. T. Bennett, 1831 (spottail spiny turbot)
 Psettodes bennetti Steindachner, 1870 (spiny turbot)
 Psettodes erumei (Bloch & J. G. Schneider, 1801) (Indian halibut)

References

Pleuronectiformes
Taxa named by Edward Turner Bennett